Cryphalogenes exiguus, is a species of weevil found in Sri Lanka.

Description
Similar to much larger species Cryphalogenes euphorbiae. Length of the male is about 0.8 to 1.0 mm. Body dark brown. Frons strongly convex with small less conspicuous granules. Pronotum strongly reticulate. Pronotal and elytral granules are large. Surface largely reticulate, and feebly granulate moderate minute punctures. Antennal club slightly longer than scape. Pronotum with almost straight sides and parallel on basal third with reticulate, shiny, granules in posterior areas. Elytra long as pronotum and with almost straight sides. Elytral striae not impressed, each puncture largely replaced by a large rounded granule. Elytral interstriae as wide as striae, with scales averaging more slender.

References 

Curculionidae
Insects of Sri Lanka
Beetles described in 1980